Dewi Cross (born 6 December 1999) is a Welsh rugby union player who plays for Ospreys as a winger.

Cross made his debut for the Ospreys in 2018 against Gloucester having previously played for the Ospreys academy.

References

External links 
Ospreys Player Profile

1999 births
Living people
Ospreys (rugby union) players
Rugby union players from Bridgend
Welsh rugby union players
Rugby union wings